The Delfin family, singular Dolfin or Delfin[o], is a prominent noble family of Venice, part of the twelve original noble lineages of the Republic, known as the "apostolic families", thought to have elected the first Doge of Venice in the year 697 a.C.

Notable members

 Domenico Dolfin, Duke of Candia (1216-1217).
 Baldovino Dolfin (1275-1335), statesman.
 Giacomo Dolfin, Duke of Candia (1261-1262)
 Giovanni Dolfin (c. 1290-1361), 57th Doge of Venice.
 Leonardo Delfino (1353-1415) Patriarch of Alexandria.
 Dolfin Dolfin, captain during the fall of Constantinople (1453)
 Zaccaria Delfino (1527–1583), Cardinal (by Pious IV).
 Giovanni Delfin (1529-1584), Bishop of Brescia and Torcello.
 Gentile Dolfino (+1601), Bishop of Camerino.
 Giovanni Delfin (1545-1622), Cardinal (by Clemens VIII)
 Flaminio Delfin (1552-1605), Commander General of the Papal Armies.
 Vittoria Delfin, mother of Pope Clement X.
 Giovanni Delfino (1589-1651), bishop of Belluno.
 Giovanni Dolfin (1617-1699), Cardinal (by Alexander VII) and poet.
 Daniel Delfin (1653–1704), Cardinal (by Innocent XII) and Patriarch of Aquileia.
 Daniel Delfin (1656-1729), Admiral of the Venetian Fleet.
 Dionisus Delfin (1663–1734), Patriarch of Aquileia
 Daniele Delfin (1688-1762), Cardinale (by Benedict XIV), Patriarch of Aquileia.
 Giovanni Paolo Delfini (1736-1819), Bishop.
 Caterina Dolfin (1736-1796), poet.
 Daniel Delfin (1748-1798), statesman and diplomat (ambassador to Louis XVI of France)

Palaces and villas

Palazzo Dolfin Manin (San Salvatore, Venice)
 Palazzo Ca' Dolfin (Ca' Foscari University)
 Palazzo Dolfin Bollani
 Palazzo Dolfin Casale (Rosà)
 Palazzo Dolfin (San Polo, Venice)
 Palazzo de' Delfini (Rome)
 Palazzo Dolfin Boniotti (Fratta Polesine)
 Villa Correr Dolfin
 Villa Dolfin Boldù (Rosà)
 Villa Dolfin Giustinian

Bibliography
 B. G. Dolfin, I Dolfin patrizi veneziani nella storia di Venezia dal 452 al 1923, Milano 1923.
 Ganzer, Gilberto, Splendori di una dinastia: L'eredita europea dei Manin e dei Dolfin. 
 Cardinale Delfino, patriarca d'Aquileia, Rituale romano illustrato, Bettinelli, Venezia 1749.
 P. Gradenigo, Ambasciatori veneti, cc. 60, 164, 302, 308v.

House of Dolfin
Italian noble families
Republic of Venice families
Venetian noble families